Mumba Malila (born 16 April 1964) is a Zambian supreme court judge serving as the 8th chief justice of Zambia since 2021. Prior to his appointment, Malila was the Zambian attorney general from 2011 to 2014 and then he was appointed as a supreme court Judge by Michael Sata. He also once saved as the Commissioner for the African Commission on Human and Peoples’ Rights and its Vice Chairperson from October 2006 to November 2011.

References 

Living people
1964 births
Chief justices of Zambia
Zambian judges
21st-century judges
20th-century lawyers
University of Zambia alumni